ABC of Emergency Radiology is a book edited by British radiologist Otto Chan. It is meant to be useful in emergencies by providing examples to refer to. The book addresses the difficulties in evaluating a radiograph during emergency situations. It also highlights comparisons between normal and abnormal radiographs. One of the main themes of the book is how to avoid the mistakes that can occur. It is aimed at trainee radiologists and medical students. It presents radiology from a British perspective and emphasizes plain radiography and sonography.

References

External links
 Chan, O., Walsh, M., and Wilson, A. (14-05-2005) Extract from ABC of emergency radiology. National Center for Biotechnology Information, United States National Library of Medicine.
 Chan, O., Walsh, M., and Wilson, A. (14-05-2005) Clinical review: ABC of emergency radiology. British Medical Journal.

Medical manuals